Wayne Township is one of fifteen townships in Wayne County, Indiana, United States. As of the 2010 census, its population was 41,217 and it contained 19,510 housing units.

History
Wayne Township was organized in 1810.

The Forest Hills Country Club and Abram Gaar House and Farm are listed on the National Register of Historic Places.

Geography
The streams of Boro Brook, Bridge Brook, Chester Creek, Clear Creek, Evans Creek, Middle Fork East Fork Whitewater River, Mud Creek, Short Creek, Spring Run, Tree Brook and West Fork/East Fork of Whitewater River run through this township.

Cities and towns
 Richmond (the county seat) (vast majority)
 Spring Grove

Unincorporated towns
 Chester at 
 East Haven at 
 Greenwood at 
 Middleboro at 
 South Richmond at 
 Spring Grove Heights at 
(This list is based on USGS data and may include former settlements.)

Cemeteries
The township contains eight cemeteries: Earlham, Hoover Bulla, King, Lutherania, Ridge, Saint Andrews, State Line and Wernle.

Major highways
 Interstate 70
 U.S. Route 27
 U.S. Route 35
 U.S. Route 40
 State Road 38
 State Road 121
 State Road 227

References
 U.S. Board on Geographic Names (GNIS)
 United States Census Bureau cartographic boundary files

External links
 Indiana Township Association
 United Township Association of Indiana

Townships in Wayne County, Indiana
Townships in Indiana